Osborn/Central Avenue (also known as Park Central) is a station on Valley Metro Rail in Phoenix, Arizona, United States. It is the seventh stop southbound and the twenty-second stop northbound on the initial 20-mile starter line.

Nearby places
 Phoenix Central Neighborhood
 Phoenix Financial Center
 Park Central Mall
 St. Joseph's Hospital and Medical Center
 Phoenix Corporate Center

Ridership

Bus connections

References

External links
 Valley Metro map

Valley Metro Rail stations in Phoenix, Arizona
Railway stations in the United States opened in 2008
2008 establishments in Arizona